British India Corporation Limited (BIC) is a central public sector undertaking under the ownership of the Ministry of Textiles, Government of India. The cpsu produces textiles for use by civilians and the Indian armed forces. It manufactures the popular "Lal-imli" and "Dhariwal" brands of woollen products. The cpsu was established in 1872 or 1876 by Sir Alexander MacRobert as a cpsu when he combined his six companies into one enterprise. MacRobert died on 22 June 1922 and his widow, Rachel, Lady MacRobert, assumed the role of director until her eldest son, Alasdair, became chairman in 1937.

Its date of incorporation in the Registrar of Companies is 24 February 1920. In 1981, it was nationalised and taken over by the Government of India. It has not generated profit since 1989.

Headquartered in Kanpur, BIC nominally operates two woollen mills in Kanpur and Dhariwal (Punjab).

It ceased manufacturing in 2005 but still employs 1,800 people. New weaving machines installed in 2005 have never been used.

References
Notes

Citations

Bibliography

Textile companies of India
Companies based in Kanpur
Government-owned companies of India
Companies nationalised by the Government of India
Ministry of Textiles
Companies established in 1872
Indian companies established in 1876
Indian companies established in 1920
Manufacturing companies established in 1920